Kumani is a name referring to Ultras supporters of various sports clubs from the city of Kumanovo in North Macedonia.

History 

The fans started to organize in the late 70's when there was an expansion of creation of fan groups in Yugoslavia. The first fan groups were called: Ultras, Eagles, Front and Sokolanci(the most loyal fans of Kumani Zapad). In 1989 all of them united under the name Delta Force. This name didn't stay for long when on 19 February 1990 it was changed into Kumani. The name came from the Asian nomadic tribe Cumans that lived in Kumanovo in the Middle Ages.
Their main transparent is Kumani-Zapad.

Rivalry 

In March 2012 an incident was registered in Boris Trajkovski Arena between Kumani. and Lirija from Saraj municipality in Skopje. The first provocation started from Lirija fans when they were sitting and making noises when Macedonian anthem was playing. Later Kimani fans were fighting with the fans and the Police. 
In October 2012 in SRC Kale Kumani were fighting Komiti fans, police had to intervene and stands were emptied at halftime. October 2013 after an incident on the stands four Kumani members war arrested during a basketball game between KK Kumanovo and KK Vardar.
On April 8th 2014 one Kumani supporter was attacked by four Crvena Zvezda supporters.

Notable Fans 

The so-called adult movie star Karlo Boss is supporter  of Kumani.
Pero Brko from Sokolana is also supporter of Kumani.

See also 
Sports in Kumanovo
Komiti Skopje fans from Skopje
Čkembari fans from Bitola

Gallery

References

External links 
 Official web site (Macedonian)
 Official Facebook page
 Youtube videos
 Mar 2012 events, text and videos
 Delije Sep 2012 attack (Macedonian)
 Oct 2012 Kale issues (Macedonian)
 Karlo Boss (Macedonian)
 Кумани Историја (Macedonian)

Kumanovo
Ultras groups